"Galama" ("Noise") is a song recorded by Serbian pop recording artist Dara Bubamara. It was released 26 April 2011 and was featured as a bonus track on her twelfth studio album Dara 2013, released by City Records. The lyrics were written by Marina Tucaković and the song was arranged by composer Aleksandar Kobac, with music by DJ Kim from France. It was produced and recorded in Belgrade. A week after its release, Galama was chosen as "Hit of Day" but Radio Svet.

The song is a Serbian remake of "Ray Rayi" by Morocco rapper Nocif featuring singer Cheb Rayan. The music video, directed by Nikola Kesić, premiered 19 June 2011.

References

External links
Delete at Discogs

2011 singles
2011 songs
Songs written by Marina Tucaković
Music videos shot in Belgrade